Hebburn is a BBC television comedy series set in Hebburn in Tyne & Wear. The six-part series commenced broadcasting on BBC Two on 18 October 2012 starring Kimberley Nixon and Chris Ramsey. The show is written by Jason Cook and Graham Duff and follows the recently wedded couple Jack and Sarah alongside Jack's family.

The show received a mixed critical reaction, including criticism from residents of the town on which it was based. A Christmas special was commissioned as well as a second series, which began airing on BBC Two on 12 November 2013. In March 2014 it was announced by the BBC that Hebburn would not be returning for a third series.

Plot
The series follows the Pearson family, Joe (Vic Reeves, credited under his real name, Jim Moir) and Pauline (Gina McKee) and their son Jack (Chris Ramsey), who secretly married a middle-class Jewish woman, Sarah (Kimberley Nixon), in a drunken binge in Las Vegas.

Development and production

Hebburn was created by comic Jason Cook, inspired by Hebburn in South Tyneside, the town in which he was raised. It was piloted in October 2011 through a live performance as part of the Salford Sitcom Showcase at MediaCityUK. A six-part series was then commissioned by Channel X North and Steve Coogan's production company Baby Cow Productions. Cook co-wrote the series with Graham Duff, who had written the sitcom Ideal.

Chris Ramsey, a comic from South Shields, was cast to play Jack Pearson, with Kimberley Nixon as his new wife, Sarah. Vic Reeves (credited under his real name, Jim Moir) and Gina McKee were cast as his parents. The show also featured Geordie actors Victoria Elliott and Lisa McGrillis, alongside performances from North East stand-ups Steffen Peddie, Barry Dodds and Alfie Joey.

Principal photography began with a week's shoot on location in Hebburn on 23 April 2012, with the production based at High Lane Social Club in the town. Park Road, the street on which Cook was raised, prominently featured in the shoot. Following the location shoot in South Tyneside, the production moved to its main base at studios in Manchester.

The series concluded with Joe, played by Moir, having a stroke at Jack and Sarah's wedding. Writer Jason Cook says that this was important for him as his own father had a stroke, "so that was like a love letter to my mum and dad." His father's stroke had inspired Cook's critically acclaimed 2007 stand-up show, My Confessions. The fictitious pub in the show 'Swayze's' is an in joke for those familiar with Hebburn town, poking fun at a local run down pub called "The Road House" (Road House was a Patrick Swayze film). The exterior scenes of the pub where filmed outside "The Kelly" public house in Hebburn.

Filming of the second series began in August 2013. It was announced in August that Melanie Hill would join the cast for the second series, and, pending some teasing about Cook about a "propa legend" in the second series, it was revealed that Tim Healy would have a cameo role in the first episode of the second series. The series will also feature Toby Hadoke, Alfie Joey, Seymour Mace and Terry Joyce.

Cast
Chris Ramsey as Jack Pearson
Kimberley Nixon as Sarah Pearson
Gina McKee as Pauline Pearson
Vic Reeves as Joe Pearson (credited as “Jim Moir”)
Lisa McGrillis as Vicki Pearson
Pat Dunn as Dot
Jason Cook as Ramsey
Curtis Appleby as Hutchy
Kathryn Hunt as Siobhan
Neil Grainger as Gervaise
Victoria Elliott as Denise
Jan Ravens as Susan
Phil Nice as Ben
Verity-May Henry as Marial
Steffen Peddie as Big Keith
Barry Dodds as The Heckler

Episodes

Series one

Series two

"Sleep in Hebburnly Peace" - Christmas Special
A Christmas special aired in December 2013 featuring Miriam Margolyes as Millie, Sarah's grandmother. The special was the last-ever episode of the show, as it was axed in March 2014.

Reception
The first series received mixed reviews. The Guardians Sam Wollaston labelled the series "Hebburn Meh-burn", saying that its "neither brave nor original," claiming that the characters "don't behave or speak like real people, they behave and speak like a sitcom family." 
similarly, The Independents Tom Sutcliffe suggested "there's not a lot in Hebburn that you haven't seen before", comparing the show to The Royle Family. However, Sutcliffe says that Hebburn "is quite distinctively its own thing", and praises the show's "sharpness of characterisation for them to show how good they can be right from the off."

Some people from Hebburn, including a local councillor, objected to the show's portrayal of the town and its residents. However, despite the mixed critical reaction, a second series and Christmas special were commissioned, with writer Jason Cook revealing ambitions to launch a four-day comedy festival in the town.

The second series, broadcast in autumn 2013, also received mixed reviews. Writing for The Guardian, Dominic Sandbrook said: "It’s still not exactly subtle comedy, but the first episode of the new run turned out to have more gags than the whole of the first series combined. If scriptwriter Jason Cook can belatedly find his sense of humour, then so can the people of Hebburn." The Independents Ellen E Jones branded the series "a relic from a different era", saying that "it really belongs to that breed of untaxing sitcom in which the gentle laughs are so predictable that you could set your pacemaker by them." In contrast to the broadsheets, South Tyneside local newspaper Shields Gazettes Vicki Newman, who "was given exclusive behind-the-scenes access during filming", praised the show, writing that it "has so much heart that, to me, it was no surprise that it was commissioned for a second series. The show looks sharper, and it just feels bigger and better than the first series."

In January 2013, Hebburn was voted the "Best New TV Sitcom" in the Comedy.co.uk Awards held by the British Comedy Guide. The show won the regional Royal Television Society award in March 2013, and was nominated in the Best Comedy category in the National Television Awards.

DVD release
Only the first series has been released on DVD. The complete first series of Hebburn was released onto DVD on 26 November 2012. Series Two is available as a digital download only from Amazon.
Although both series are available on BBC iPlayer as at March 2023.

References

External links

2010s British sitcoms
2012 British television series debuts
2013 British television series endings
BBC television sitcoms
English-language television shows
Television shows set in Tyne and Wear